Gunter Schoß (born 2 December 1940 in Berlin, Germany) is a German voice and television actor.

Among numerous other projects, he was the German voice of Donald Sutherland's character in Pride and Prejudice and of Frank Langella as Merneptah in the 1995 film Moses.

External links

Tatsch Agency Berlin 

1940 births
Living people
Male actors from Berlin
East German actors
German male television actors
German male voice actors